Ventana (Spanish for "window") can refer to:

 Club Hotel de la Ventana, a hotel resort opened in 1911 in Argentina
 Sierra de La Ventana, a small town in Tornquist Partido in Argentina
 Ventana Cave, a National Historic Landmark in Arizona, U.S.
 Ventana Double Cone, a twin mountaintop in the Ventana Wilderness
 Ventana Wilderness, an area in the Santa Lucia Mountains in California
 Ventana Wildlife Society, a  non- profit environmental organization in California
 La Ventana, a town in Baja California Sur,  Mexico
 La Ventana (yearbook),  the yearbook of Texas Tech University in Lubbock, Texas, U.S.
 a fictional nuclear power plant in the 1979 movie  The China Syndrome